Fiji national beach soccer team represents Fiji in international beach soccer competitions and is controlled by the Fiji Football Association, the governing body for football in Fiji.

Current squad
Correct as of February 2011

Coach: Intiaz Khan

Achievements
FIFA Beach Soccer World Cup qualification (OFC) Best: Third place
2011

References

External links
Squad

Oceanian national beach soccer teams
Beach Soccer
Beach soccer in Fiji